Unia Leszno are a motorcycle speedway team established in 1938 and based in Leszno, Poland. The team's home track is at the Stadion Alfreda Smoczyka. They compete in the Ekstraliga (the highest division) and have won the Team Speedway Polish Championship 18 times. including from the 2017 to 2020.

History

1949 to 1962 
The club competed in the inaugural 1948 Polish speedway season, under the name of LKM Leszno and won the silver medal. The following year they captured the gold medal during the 1949 Polish speedway season and Leszno rider Alfred Smoczyk won the Polish Individual Speedway Championship. The team dominated the Championship during the following period and won six successive league titles from 1949 to 1954. The club later won bronze medals in 1958 and 1962.

1963 to 1978 
The 1960s were a much quieter time for the club as Rybnik dominated Polish speedway. Although Henryk Żyto won the 1963 Polish Individual Speedway Championship, the club were relegated in 1964. They won the Polish Speedway First League in 1966 but failed to gain promotion based on the two year system at the time. They finally gained promotion in 1972 and began to compete again by the mid-70s. The team contained riders such as Zdzisław Dobrucki and Bernard Jąder who would win three Polish titles between them. Two bronze medals in 1975 and 1976 and one silver medal in 1977 ensued.

1979 to 1990 

1979 to 1990 was a golden period for the club as they won five Polish championship gold medals, two silvers and one bronze. In addition they won the Polish Pairs Speedway Championship five times in 1980, 1984, 1987, 1988 and 1989 and Roman Jankowski was twice Polish champion and Zenon Kasprzak was champion in 1990.

1991 to 2001
In contrast to earlier success, the club spent 11 years struggling, with the exception of winning the second division in 1996. They were however inaugural members of the Ekstraliga in 2000.

2002 to present
In 2002, a return to form saw the team win the silver medal and Unia became one of the leading teams in Polish speedway for the next two decades, matching the 1980s achievements. They have won ten medals, including seven gold's in 2007, 2010, 2015, 2017, 2018, 2019 and 2020. Five more Polish Pairs championships were added and riders such as Janusz Kołodziej, Jarosław Hampel and Piotr Pawlicki Jr. have all become Polish champions. Foreign riders such as Leigh Adams, Nicki Pedersen and Emil Saifutdinov have been integral in their gold medal wins in recent years.

Teams

2023 team
 Chris Holder
 Janusz Kolodziej
 Bartosz Smektała 
 Jaimon Lidsey
 Grzegorz Zengota 
 Damian Ratajczak
 Maksym Borowiak
 Antoni Mencel
 Hubert Jablonski
 James Pearson
 Tobias Musielak
 Jakub Oleksiak
 Nazar Parnitskyi
 Maurice Brown

Previous teams

2022 team

 Janusz Kolodziej
 Piotr Pawlicki 
 Jason Doyle 
 David Bellego 
 Jaimon Lidsey
 Jesper Knudsen
 Jonas Kundsen
 James Pearson
 Keynan Rew
 Hubert Scibak
 Damian Ratajczak
 Maksym Borowiak
 Antoni Mencel
 Hubert Jablonski

Notable riders

Honours

Team Polish Champions
Gold: 18* (1949, 1950, 1951, 1952, 1953, 1954, 1979, 1980, 1984*, 1987, 1988, 1989, 2007, 2010, 2015, 2017, 2018, 2019, 2020)
Silver: 8 (1948, 1977, 1982, 1983, 2002, 2008, 2011, 2014)
Bronze: 7 (1958, 1962, 1975, 1976, 1981, 1985, 1986)

Pair Polish Champion
Gold: 10 (1980, 1984, 1987, 1988, 1989, 2003, 2012, 2015, 2019, 2020)
Silver: 9 (1978, 1982, 1985, 1991, 1994, 1999, 2008, 2016, 2022)
Bronze: 2 (2007, 2009)

Individual Polish Champion
Gold: 13 (1949, 1950, 1963, 1976, 1978, 1980, 1981, 1988, 1990, 2010, 2011, 2018, 2019)
Silver: 9 (1955, 1962, 1987, 1988, 1996, 2008, 2009, 2014, 2016)
Bronze: 9 (1961, 1982, 1987, 1988, 1996, 2007, 2018, 2021, 2022)

References

Polish speedway teams
Leszno
Sport in Greater Poland Voivodeship